Manuel Saavedra (24 April 1941 – 26 August 2011) was a Chilean footballer. He played in two matches for the Chile national football team in 1967. He was also part of Chile's squad for the 1967 South American Championship.

References

External links
 

1941 births
2011 deaths
Chilean footballers
Chile international footballers
Unión La Calera footballers
Chilean Primera División players
People from Los Andes Province, Chile
Association football forwards
20th-century Chilean people
21st-century Chilean people